Chocolate bullets are a type of confectionery sold by confectionery companies in Australia and New Zealand, such as FYNA, Darrell Lea or Cadbury (the latter formerly as The Natural Confectionery Company). They consist of a licorice bullet coated with milk or dark chocolate.

Their shape is elliptical, oval-shaped, or cylindrical with curved ends.

Australian confectionery
Chocolate
Liquorice (confectionery)